Cities and towns under the oblast's jurisdiction:
Ryazan (Рязань) (administrative center)
city districts:
Moskovsky (Московский)
Oktyabrsky (Октябрьский)
Sovetsky (Советский)
Zheleznodorozhny (Железнодорожный)
Kasimov (Касимов)
Sasovo (Сасово)
Skopin (Скопин)
Districts:
Alexandro-Nevsky (Александро-Невский)
Urban-type settlements under the district's jurisdiction:
Alexandro-Nevsky (Александро-Невский)
with 14 rural okrugs under the district's jurisdiction.
Chuchkovsky (Чучковский)
Urban-type settlements under the district's jurisdiction:
Chuchkovo (Чучково)
with 12 rural okrugs under the district's jurisdiction.
Kadomsky (Кадомский)
Urban-type settlements under the district's jurisdiction:
Kadom (Кадом)
with 10 rural okrugs under the district's jurisdiction.
Kasimovsky (Касимовский)
Urban-type settlements under the district's jurisdiction:
Gus-Zhelezny (Гусь-Железный)
Syntul (Сынтул)
Yelatma (Елатьма)
with 28 rural okrugs under the district's jurisdiction.
Klepikovsky (Клепиковский)
Towns under the district's jurisdiction:
Spas-Klepiki (Спас-Клепики)
Urban-type settlements under the district's jurisdiction:
Tuma (Тума)
with 23 rural okrugs under the district's jurisdiction.
Korablinsky (Кораблинский)
Towns under the district's jurisdiction:
Korablino (Кораблино)
with 20 rural okrugs under the district's jurisdiction.
Mikhaylovsky (Михайловский)
Towns under the district's jurisdiction:
Mikhaylov (Михайлов)
Urban-type settlements under the district's jurisdiction:
Oktyabrsky (Октябрьский)
with 24 rural okrugs under the district's jurisdiction.
Miloslavsky (Милославский)
Urban-type settlements under the district's jurisdiction:
Miloslavskoye (Милославское)
Tsentralny (Центральный)
with 17 rural okrugs under the district's jurisdiction.
Pitelinsky (Пителинский)
Urban-type settlements under the district's jurisdiction:
Pitelino (Пителино)
with 11 rural okrugs under the district's jurisdiction.
Pronsky (Пронский)
Towns under the district's jurisdiction:
Novomichurinsk (Новомичуринск)
Urban-type settlements under the district's jurisdiction:
Pronsk (Пронск)
with 12 rural okrugs under the district's jurisdiction.
Putyatinsky (Путятинский)
with 10 rural okrugs under the district's jurisdiction.
Ryazansky (Рязанский)
with 35 rural okrugs under the district's jurisdiction.
Ryazhsky (Ряжский)
Towns under the district's jurisdiction:
Ryazhsk (Ряжск)
with 16 rural okrugs under the district's jurisdiction.
Rybnovsky (Рыбновский)
Towns under the district's jurisdiction:
Rybnoye (Рыбное)
with 16 rural okrugs under the district's jurisdiction.
Sapozhkovsky (Сапожковский)
Urban-type settlements under the district's jurisdiction:
Sapozhok (Сапожок)
with 9 rural okrugs under the district's jurisdiction.
Sarayevsky (Сараевский)
Urban-type settlements under the district's jurisdiction:
Sarai (Сараи)
with 25 rural okrugs under the district's jurisdiction.
Sasovsky (Сасовский)
with 27 rural okrugs under the district's jurisdiction.
Shatsky (Шацкий)
Towns under the district's jurisdiction:
Shatsk (Шацк)
with 28 rural okrugs under the district's jurisdiction.
Shilovsky (Шиловский)
Urban-type settlements under the district's jurisdiction:
Lesnoy (Лесной)
Shilovo (Шилово)
with 21 rural okrugs under the district's jurisdiction.
Skopinsky (Скопинский)
Urban-type settlements under the district's jurisdiction:
Pavelets (Павелец)
Pobedinka (Побединка)
with 27 rural okrugs under the district's jurisdiction.
Spassky (Спасский)
Towns under the district's jurisdiction:
Spassk-Ryazansky (Спасск-Рязанский)
with 30 rural okrugs under the district's jurisdiction.
Starozhilovsky (Старожиловский)
Urban-type settlements under the district's jurisdiction:
Starozhilovo (Старожилово)
with 10 rural okrugs under the district's jurisdiction.
Ukholovsky (Ухоловский)
Urban-type settlements under the district's jurisdiction:
Ukholovo (Ухолово)
with 12 rural okrugs under the district's jurisdiction.
Yermishinsky (Ермишинский)
Urban-type settlements under the district's jurisdiction:
Yermish (Ермишь)
with 11 rural okrugs under the district's jurisdiction.
Zakharovsky (Захаровский)
with 14 rural okrugs under the district's jurisdiction.

References

Ryazan Oblast
Ryazan Oblast